"Kili Watch" is a song originally recorded by the Belgian band . They released it in 1960 (as a single and on an EP).

Charts

Johnny Hallyday version (in French) 

In the same year, the song was adapted into French by lyricists  and recorded by Johnny Hallyday. His version spent one week at no. 1 on the singles sales chart in France (from 9 to 15 January 1961).

Charts

References 

1960 songs
1961 singles
Johnny Hallyday songs
Disques Vogue singles
Number-one singles in France
Songs written by Jil & Jan